Agustín de Carlos Elduayen (born 4 August 1964) is a Spanish retired footballer who played as a goalkeeper.

Club career
Born in San Sebastián, Elduayen made his professional debuts with local Real Sociedad, being barred by legendary Luis Arconada. In the 1985–86 season, however, as the starter suffered a severe injury in the first La Liga game, he was chosen by manager John Toshack as his successor, and the Basques eventually finished in seventh position but with one of the worst defensive records in the competition (51 goals against with 34 matches from the player).

In the 1986 summer, Elduayen signed with fellow top flight club Atlético Madrid, starting in his first year but being relegated to the substitutes bench after the emergence of Abel Resino, who had been playing with the reserves.

He experienced his best years with Real Burgos CF, helping the lowly Castile and León side to three consecutive seasons in the first division. In 1991–92, as they finished in a best-ever ninth position, he played in all 38 games (3,338 minutes) and only conceded 43 goals, winning the Don Balón Award for Best Spanish Player in the process.

In 1993, after Burgos relegation, Elduayen signed for Deportivo de La Coruña for about 1 million pesetas. With Francisco Liaño firmly established as first-choice for Super Depor, he could only appear three times in the league in three seasons combined, subsequently leaving for Real Valladolid, where he met exactly the same fate in exactly the same period of time, retiring from the game at the age of 35.

Having spent 16 seasons in Spain's top division, Elduayen appeared in 179 games. Whilst at Burgos he was summoned by manager Vicente Miera to the Spanish national team, but eventually did not make his debut.

Honours

Club
Deportivo
Copa del Rey: 1994–95
Supercopa de España: 1995

Country
Spain U21
UEFA European Under-21 Championship: 1986

Individual
Don Balón Award – Best Spanish Player: 1992

References

External links

Biography at Porteros Vascos de Leyenda 

1964 births
Living people
Spanish footballers
Footballers from San Sebastián
Association football goalkeepers
La Liga players
Segunda División B players
Real Sociedad B footballers
Real Sociedad footballers
Atlético Madrid footballers
Real Burgos CF footballers
Deportivo de La Coruña players
Real Valladolid players
Spain youth international footballers
Spain under-21 international footballers